The 5th Overseas Interarmes Regiment (in French 5eme Regiment Interarmes d'Outre Mer (or RIOM)) is a troupes de marine regiment stationed in Djibouti. It has been the Djibouti garrison since 1 November 1969.

It is the last combined arms regiment in the French army comprising a mechanised infantry company, a light cavalry squadron, an artillery battery and a command and support company.

Recent commanding officers
 1985–1987: Colonel Kelche
 1987–1989: Colonel Coste
 1989–1991: Colonel Delort
 1991–1993: Colonel de Saqui de Sannes
 1993–1995: Colonel Bidard
 1995–1997: Colonel Boulnois
 1997–1999: Colonel Clément-Bollée
 1999–2001: Colonel de Bourdoncle de Saint Salvy
 2001–2003: Colonel Boubée de Gramont
 2003–2005: Colonel Toutous
 2005–2007: Colonel Bucquet
 2007–2009: Colonel Millot
 2009–: Colonel Gauthier

Organisation
Based at Quartier Brière de l'Isle. The Regiment is made up of:
 Headquarters Company (CCS)
 1st Infantry Company equipped with VAB and missile CA;
 2nd Battery, an anti-aircraft unit equipped with MISTRAL and NC1;
 3rd Armoured Squadron, equipped with AMX 10 RC;
 6th Battery, Artillery unit equipped with 155mm towed cannon Tr-F1 and 120mm mortars.

Since 1 August 2008, the Aviation Battalion Light Djibouti (MNAAvBn) equipped with Puma and Gazelle helicopters has been attached to the 5th RIAOM.

Flag of the regiment

Decorations
 Croix de Guerre 1914–1918 three palms (5e RIC)
 Croix de Guerre 1914–1918 deux palms and a silver star (battalion Somali)
 Croix de guerre 1939–1945 a palm and a silver star (battalion Somali)
 Croix de Guerre TOE of a palm (5e RIC/ Light body for action)
 Two national orders of Laos – Order of the Million Elephants and the White Parasol and Order of the Reign, Bronze class

Sources and bibliography
 Erwan Bergot, La coloniale du Rif au Tchad 1925–1980, imprimé en France : décembre 1982, n° d'éditeur 7576, n° d'imprimeur 31129, sur les presses de l'imprimerie Hérissey.

Marines regiments of France
Infantry regiments of France
Armoured regiments of France
Artillery regiments of France
20th-century regiments of France
21st-century regiments of France
Military units and formations established in 1890